Lenín Boltaire Moreno Garcés (born 19 March 1953) is an Ecuadorian politician who served as the 46th president of Ecuador, from 2017 to 2021. Moreno was vice president from 2007 to 2013, serving under President Rafael Correa.

He was nominated as the candidate for Correa's PAIS Alliance, a social democratic political party, in the 2017 presidential election and won a narrow victory in Ecuador's second round of voting on 2 April 2017. However, after his election Moreno drastically shifted his political stance, distancing himself from Correa's leftist legacy in both domestic and foreign policy. By the end of Moreno's presidency, he had left office with a staggeringly low approval rating of 9%, the lowest in modern Ecuadorian history. He was expelled from PAIS Alliance in March 2021 after the party's crushing defeat in the 2021 elections.

Moreno was shot in a 1998 robbery attempt and thereafter has used a wheelchair. For his advocacy for people with disabilities, he was nominated for the 2012 Nobel Peace Prize. According to The New York Times, while he was in office from 2017 to 2021, Moreno was the world's only serving head of state to use a wheelchair.

Background

Childhood 
Lenín Moreno was born into a middle-class family in Nuevo Rocafuerte, a small town in the Ecuadorian Amazon, near the Peruvian border. His father, Servio Tulio Moreno, was a teacher who promoted bilingual education and integrated schools for indigenous children and mestizo children and who later became a senator. His parents named him after men they admired; his father liked Vladimir Lenin and his mother Voltaire, although an error in the civil registration turned his middle name into Boltaire (in Spanish the letters v and b correspond to the same phoneme). He moved to Quito with his family when he was three years old.

Education 
Moreno studied in Quito at the Instituto Nacional Mejía (Mejia National Institute), the Colegio Nacional Sebastián Benalcázar (Sebastian Benalcazar National School), and the Universidad Central del Ecuador (Central University of Ecuador), where he earned a degree in Public Administration and was honored as the best graduate. He studied psychology.

Career 
Moreno began his career in 1976 as the director of the Continental Professional Training Center. He went on to become Director of OMC Publigerencia Andina, sales manager of Satho and marketing manager of Zitro, all located in Ecuador. Then he moved to the public sector, taking an administrative post with the Minister of Government. He worked extensively in the public tourism industry. He founded the Chamber of Tourism of Pichincha, a province in Ecuador, and was executive director of the National Federation of Tourism Chambers and executive director of the Chamber of Tourism of Pichincha, between 1997 and 1999.

Politics and awards 
Moreno has earned numerous awards while serving as vice president of Ecuador: the "Fray Jodoco Ricke" Award; the Order of the Sun of Peru in the rank of Grand Cross; and the Order of Merit to the Democracy, presented by the governments of Peru, Guatemala and Colombia, respectively. He was also recognized unanimously by the Council of the Metropolitan District of Quito with the order of Gran Collar Sebastian Benalcazar.
He earned a Honoris Causa Masters, from the Business School (ESAE), Spain, on 25 November 2011.

Moreno was appointed as Special Envoy on Disability and Accessibility by United Nations Secretary-General Ban Ki-moon in December 2013.

Eventa Foundation 
After being shot, Moreno created the "Eventa" foundation to promote humor and joy as a way of life-based on his personal experiences.

Vice Presidency 

During his first year in the office of Vice President, Moreno investigated the state of disabled people in Ecuador. At the time the government's entire budget for disabled services was approximately US$100,000. Moreno increased the budget for disabled people more than fifty-fold. The state currently assists over 600,000 disabled Ecuadorians, and provides housing and income for 15,000 people and prostheses for another 4,000.

Through his 'Ecuador without Borders' programme, rights for disabled people were introduced in laws passed in 2007 and 2012, and in the 2008 constitution, that empowered Ecuador's disabled; measures included in 2010 requiring companies with over 25 employees to have at least 4% of their staff people with disabilities.

Between 2009 and 2010 the Solidarity Mission sent Ecuadorean and Cuban doctors to over 1.2 million homes around the country and interviewed nearly 300,000 disabled people to find out what needs were most pressing. Many of those people received free medical checkups. And now the Solidarity Mission is spreading to Paraguay, Peru, Guatemala, Chile, El Salvador and Colombia.

Moreno left the vice presidency on 24 May 2013 and was succeeded by Jorge Glas. He was the first vice president to complete his term since 1992.

Nobel nomination 
Moreno was nominated for the 2012 Nobel Peace Prize by Celso Maldonado, Vice President of the People with Disabilities Commission of the Ecuadorian National Assembly.

Presidency of Ecuador

On 1 October 2016, Moreno was nominated as a candidate for the 2017 presidential election at the conference of Alianza País. The statement of his candidacy was made by President Rafael Correa.

On 19 February 2017 election, Moreno won the elections with 39.3% of the vote. However he was short by less than one percentage point of outright victory, as Ecuador requires in its two-round system. On 2 April 2017 runoff, he defeated Guillermo Lasso, with 51.16% of the vote.

Presidency
Within months of winning the election, Moreno started moving away from his election platform, thus igniting a feud with ex-president Rafael Correa. Later in 2018, through a referendum, Moreno reversed several key pieces of legislation passed by the Correa administration that targeted wealthy individuals and banks.

Since the creation of CPCCS-T, Moreno has used it to oust and replace government officials, provincial judges, the judicial council, and the National Electoral Council (CNE).

Moreno's government adopted a conservative policy: reduction of public spending, trade liberalization, and flexibility of the labour code. The Productive Development Act enshrines an austerity policy, and reduces the development and redistribution policies of the previous mandate. In the area of taxes, the authorities aim to "encourage the return of investors" by granting tax amnesty and proposing measures to reduce tax rates for large companies. In addition, the government waives the right to tax increases in raw material prices and foreign exchange repatriations.

Moreno's government supported plans for oil drilling in Ecuador's Amazon region.

With regard to public expenditure, the State can no longer increase public expenditure by more than 3% per year and restricts budget deficits to the repayment of interest on debt. Investments are thus significantly reduced, while privatizations are facilitated through subsidies guaranteed over several years. The government adopts the international system of dispute arbitration for all foreign investments. The first article of the Organic Law on the Defence of Labour Rights is deleted: it allowed the authorities to prosecute owners of companies that have harmed the interests of their employees by concealing resources or emptying the workshops of their machines.

Moreno announced in February 2019 that he had obtained a loan of more than $10 billion from the International Monetary Fund (IMF) and the World Bank, with which the previous government had broken off, "at rates below 5% on average and for terms of up to 30 years".

In June 2019, Moreno's government faced protests from environmentalist, indigenous and self-described patriotic groups after he permitted the US military to use the airbase on Galápagos Islands.

He faced more protests in September 2019, as pro-choice demonstrators protested the fact that Ecuador had failed to pass proposed legislation, which would have relaxed the nation's strict abortion laws to allow for abortion in the case of rape.

On 2 October 2019, Moreno declared the abolition of fuel subsidies, which in turn triggered the 2019 Ecuadorian protests. The government was forced to move from Quito to Guayaquil after effectively losing control of the capital to demonstrators. Seven people were killed and 2,100 were arrested before Moreno signed directive 883, restoring the subsidies, which ended the protests on 13 October.

Allegations of corruption 
In March 2019, the INA papers scandal sparked a congressional corruption probe into Moreno.

Mueller investigation
US Special Counsel Robert Mueller's team had been investigating a meeting between former Donald Trump campaign chairman Paul Manafort and President Moreno in Quito in 2017. Moreno talked with Manafort about removing WikiLeaks founder Julian Assange from the Ecuadorian Embassy in London and his extradition to the United States.

Foreign policies

Following a June 2018 visit by U.S. Vice President Mike Pence, who agreed with President Moreno to improve the US-Ecuador relations which were strained under the presidency of Rafael Correa, Ecuador launched a security effort with the United States, including buying weapons, radar sets, six helicopters and other equipment, as well as cooperation with the U.S. that would include training and intelligence sharing. Pence and Moreno also spoke about Julian Assange.

In August 2018, Ecuador withdrew from ALBA, a regional bloc led by Venezuela and Cuba, in a bid to further distance itself from that country's socialist state and to be more “independent” of organizations that are trying to impose “specific views” on Latin America's social and political issues.

In January 2019, Moreno supported Venezuelan opposition leader Juan Guaidó's claim to the Presidency of Venezuela, thus moving Ecuador away from its previous support of Nicolás Maduro.

In early-2019 the IMF approved a $4.2bn loan for Ecuador.
In April 2019 the World Bank approved the Social Safety Net Project for Ecuador.

After imposing new restrictions on Julian Assange, who had been given political asylum in Ecuador's London embassy since 2012, on 11 April 2019, Ecuador revoked his asylum, with Moreno saying Ecuador had "reached its limit on the behaviour of Mr Assange", allowing the Metropolitan Police to arrest him in the embassy.

By mid-2019, he moved Ecuador's diplomatic position closer to the United States as he allowed the United States to use a military airstrip on the Galápagos Islands to monitor drug trafficking and illegal fishing.

Approval rating 
Moreno maintained a majority approval rating throughout his term as vice president. In late March 2012, his management was approved by 91% of Ecuadorians.
Moreno enjoyed a popularity rating as high as 77% shortly after his election in 2017. His approval dropped slightly to around 69% by the start of 2018, before dropping to 46% by mid-2018 and further fell to under 27% by mid-2019, in May 2020, it registered 16% approval. After the 2019 Ecuadorian protests and mismanagement of the COVID-19 pandemic, Moreno reached an all-time low popularity, reaching only 5% of approval by early 2021. Moreno left office with an acceptance rate of only 9%, according to a survey by the firm Cedatos. As a result of his sharp shift to the right as president, Moreno has a higher approval rating among those who voted for Guillermo Lasso (20%) than those who voted for Moreno himself (5%), although he is now disapproved of by both groups.

Post-presidency 
Moreno did not run again for re-election in the 2021 Ecuadorian general election. On 4 March 2021 he was expelled from PAIS Alliance.

On 22 February 2023, Ecuador's attorney general Diana Salazar asked for charges to be brought against Moreno and 36 others over alleged corruption over the construction of one of the country's largest hydroelectric plants, built between 2009 and 2018. Moreno denied any accusation and said that Salazar's decision was a distraction to national issues.

On 6 March 2023, a judge approved bribery charges to be brought against Moreno over the hydroelectric plant construction between 2009 and 2018. Moreno, who currently resides in Paraguay working for the OAS, denied the charges and called them "inhumane and arbitrary."

Notes

References

External links

 VicePresidencia del Ecuador
 Sitio Web Oficial de Lenín Moreno
 Biography by CIDOB
 video: President Moreno's address to the 72nd session of the United Nations General Assembly, 20 September 2017 (English version) (UN Web TV)

|-

|-

|-

1953 births
Central University of Ecuador alumni
Ecuadorian chief executives
Ecuadorian humorists
Ecuadorian victims of crime
Grand Crosses of the Order of the Sun of Peru
Politicians with paraplegia
Living people
PAIS Alliance politicians
People from Aguarico Canton
Presidents of Ecuador
Vice presidents of Ecuador
21st-century Ecuadorian politicians
Leaders of political parties in Ecuador